Jorge Luis Velázquez (born 7 September 1982) is an Argentine professional footballer who plays as a midfielder.

Career
Velázquez had a youth spell with Huracán de Vera before he got his senior career started in 2004 with a spell in Torneo Argentino B with Germinal, he then moved to Guillermo Brown of Torneo Argentino A a year later. In 2008, Velázquez joined Primera B Nacional team Aldosivi. He made sixty-four appearances and scored seven goals for the club prior to departing in 2010. His next career move was to Unión Santa Fe, also of Primera B Nacional. Eight goals in thirty-three games followed in his debut season as the club won promotion into the 2011–12 Argentine Primera División. In the top-flight, he scored three goals in thirty-six matches.

On 5 July 2012, Velázquez completed a transfer to fellow Primera División side Belgrano. He made his debut for Belgrano in an away win at the Estadio Monumental Antonio Vespucio Liberti against River Plate. In his first five seasons with the team, Velázquez participated in one hundred and thirty-two games and scored nineteen times. On 26 July 2017, Velázquez joined Primera B Nacional team Atlético de Rafaela. He scored a goal on his debut in a Copa Argentina defeat versus Banfield. He made his 400th career appearance on 22 September against Los Andes. Velázquez secured a return to Guillermo Brown in July 2018.

Career statistics
.

Honours
Guillermo Brown
Torneo Argentino A: 2006–07 Clausura

References

External links

1982 births
Living people
Sportspeople from Santa Fe Province
Argentine footballers
Association football midfielders
Torneo Argentino B players
Torneo Argentino A players
Primera Nacional players
Argentine Primera División players
Guillermo Brown footballers
Aldosivi footballers
Unión de Santa Fe footballers
Club Atlético Belgrano footballers
Atlético de Rafaela footballers
Barracas Central players